The Incredibles is a 2004 American computer-animated superhero film.

The Incredibles may also refer to:

The Incredibles (franchise), a film franchise created by Pixar Animation Studios
The Incredibles (film score)
The Incredibles (video game)
Incredibles 2, the 2018 sequel to the first film
"The Incredibles", the team of Boeing employees that developed the initial Boeing 747
 HTC Droid Incredible, an Android smart phone
HTC Incredible S, the follow-up smart phone to Droid Incredible, also known as Incredible 2
Droid Incredible 4G LTE, also known as Incredible 3

See also 
 The Invincibles (disambiguation)
 The Invisibles (disambiguation)